The Ambassador of the Kingdom of England to the Holy Roman Emperor  was the principal diplomatic representative of the historic Kingdom of England to the Holy Roman Emperors, before the creation of the Kingdom of Great Britain in 1707.

The position was not a continuous one.

English Ambassadors and Ministers to the Emperor

Ambassadors to the Holy Roman Emperor 
 1603–1604: Stephen Lesieur Special Ambassador
 1605–?: Sir Andrew Keith Special Ambassador
 1610–1611: Sir Stephen Lesieur Special Ambassador
 1612–1613: William Cecil, 17th Baron de Ros Special Ambassador
 1612–1614: Sir Stephen Lesieur Special Ambassador
 1619–1620: James Hay, 1st Viscount Doncaster
 1620–1621: Sir Henry Wotton
 1621: John Digby, Baron Digby
 1621–1622: Simon Digby
No representation
 1635–1639: John Taylor Agent
 1636: Thomas Howard, 21st Earl of Arundel
 1641–1642: Sir Thomas Roe, supported by Sir William Curtius.
No representation
 1664–1677: Sir William Curtius Resident Ambassador

Envoys to the Holy Roman Emperor 
 1665–1667: Theobald Taaffe, 1st Earl of Carlingford
 1672–1673: Sir Bernard Gascoigne
 1673: Henry Mordaunt, 2nd Earl of Peterborough Ambassador Extraordinary
 1675–1681: Bevil Skelton
 1680–1681: Charles Middleton, 2nd Earl of Middleton
 1688–1689: Nicholas Taafe, 2nd Earl of Carlingford
 1689–1692: William Paget, 7th Baron Paget Envoy Extraordinary
 1693: George Stepney Secretary or agent
 1694–1697: Robert Sutton, 2nd Baron Lexinton Envoy Extraordinary
 1697–1700: Robert Sutton Secretary then Resident
 1701–1705: George Stepney Envoy Extraordinary
 1703–1704: Charles Whitworth Chargé d'Affaires
 1705: Charles Spencer, 3rd Earl of Sunderland
 1706: Thomas Wentworth, Baron Raby
 1707: Charles Montagu, Earl of Manchester Special Mission

After the Union of England and Scotland
In 1707 the Kingdom of England became part of the new Kingdom of Great Britain. For missions from the court of St James's after 1707, see List of ambassadors of Great Britain to the Holy Roman Emperor and then List of ambassadors of Great Britain to Austria.

References

See also
List of Holy Roman Empire ambassadors to England

Holy Roman Emperor
England
 
Ambassador
Ambassador
Ambassador
Ambassador
Ambassador
Ambassador
Ambassador
Ambassador
Ambassador
Ambassador
Ambassador
Ambassador